Richard B. Berman (born 1942) is an American lawyer, public relations executive, and former lobbyist.  Through his public affairs firm, Berman and Company, he runs several industry-funded non-profit organizations such as the Center for Consumer Freedom, the Center for Union Facts, and the Employment Policies Institute.

His organizations have run numerous media campaigns concerning obesity, soda taxation, smoking, cruelty to animals, mad cow disease, taxes, the national debt, drinking and driving, as well as the minimum wage. Through the courts and media campaigns, his company challenges regulations sought by consumer, safety and environmental groups.

Early life and family
Berman grew up in the Bronx borough of New York City. His father ran gas stations and car washes. Berman did general labor at these businesses on weekends and summers while  growing up. He attended Transylvania University in Kentucky. After graduating from college in 1964, Berman went on to William and Mary School of Law and was class of 1967. His late son was Silver Jews musician David Berman, who died by suicide on August 7, 2019 at age 52. The two had been estranged due to David's strong disapproval of his father's work.

Career
After law school, Berman worked as a labor law attorney for Bethlehem Steel, and from 1969 to 1972 he served as a corporate lawyer for Dana, an automotive parts company in Toledo, Ohio. From 1972 to 1974 he was employed as labor law director of the U.S. Chamber of Commerce in Washington, D.C.

He moved into the food and beverage industry in 1975 under the mentorship of Norman Brinker, founder and owner of the Steak & Ale chain of restaurants. Berman started a government affairs program, launched his first PAC for Brinker, and worked there until 1984. He served as executive vice president of Pillsbury Restaurant Group from 1984 to 1986. In 1986, he formed Berman and Company. In 1991, he created the Employment Policies Institute to research entry-level work issues and argue "the importance of minimum wage jobs for the poor and uneducated." In practice, this translated to opposing minimum wage hikes on the theory that they would reduce employment.

In the 1990s, Berman was the president of Beverage Retailers Against Drunk Driving (BRADD), an organization formed to combat Mothers Against Drunk Driving. As president, he argued for "tolerance of social drinking." He has also worked as a consultant for the Minimum Wage Coalition to Save Jobs.

In a document released by The New York Times on October 30, 2014, from a talk Berman gave to the Western Energy Alliance, Berman reassured potential donors about the concern that they might be found out as a supporter of one of his organizations: "We run all of this stuff through nonprofit organizations that are insulated from having to disclose donors. There is total anonymity." He also touted his "win ugly" method of personal attacks on labor union leaders, environmentalists, and others who opposed him.

Organizations 
As of May 2009, Berman was the sole owner and executive director of Berman and Company, a for-profit management firm that ran fifteen corporate-funded groups, including the Center for Consumer Freedom. He has held at least sixteen positions within these interlocking organizations. As of 2010, just six of these nonprofits provided as much as 70% of Berman and Company's revenue. Bloomberg News reported that from 2008 to 2010, Berman and Company was paid $15 million from donations to his five nonprofit organizations.
Through these organizations, Berman and Company has received 60 "POLLIE Awards" since 2002 from the American Association of Political Consultants.

Organizations founded and managed by Berman include:

The Center for Organization Research and Education
The Center for Organizational Research and Education (CORE), formerly the Center for Consumer Freedom (CCF) and Guest Choice Network (GCN), is a non-profit advocate for the food industry and was formed in 1995 with funding from tobacco giant Phillip Morris. CORE generally promotes deregulation in the marketplace against what it believes is encroachment by government or scare tactics promulgated by activist groups. CCF also runs the organizations HumaneWatch and PETA Kills Animals, which criticize the practices of HSUS and PETA, respectively. These campaigns run smear campaigns that allege that "The Humane Society of the United States gives less than one percent of the money it raises to local pet shelters", and that "PETA kills 89% of the adoptable dogs and cats in its care. Berman's attacks on animal rights organizations have gained support from many individuals and organizations working in the agriculture and agribusiness sector.

In March 2013, Charity Navigator issued a Donor Advisory advising that "the majority of the Center for Consumer Freedom's program expenses are being directed to its CEO Richard Berman's for-profit management company, Berman and Company". The Chicago Tribune depicted CCF as an organization that "employs razor-sharp wit and unconventional tactics."
Berman and Company does not publicly name its clients; 60 Minutes obtained a list of companies that funded the Center for Consumer Freedom in 2002. Among the parties named were The Coca-Cola Company, Tyson Foods, Outback Steakhouse, Wendy's International, Inc., Brinker International (parent company of Chili's and Macaroni Grill), Arby's, Hooters, and Red Lobster.

American Beverage Institute
The American Beverage Institute (ABI) is a trade association opposed to laws intended to criminalize alcohol consumption, including the push to further lower existing blood-alcohol arrest thresholds.

Employment Policies Institute
The Employment Policies Institute (EPI) is a nonprofit research center opposed to raising the minimum wage, particularly in the labor-intensive restaurant industry. 'TIME Magazine' described EPI's work as helping to "lay the groundwork for the minimum-wage fight in 2014."

Center for Union Facts
The Center for Union Facts (CUF)  argues that unions are corrupt and bad for workers. It has run full-page ads in major print media outlets (New York Times, Wall Street Journal, and The Washington Post) blaming trade unions for the bankruptcies of American industries. The CUF website purports that it is the largest online database of labor-union reporting on salaries, budgets, and political spending. CUF has produced TV ads alleging intimidation by trade unions. CUF is a non-profit; 2007 federal tax returns showed revenues of $2.5 million, with $840,000 being paid to Berman and Company for management services.

Enterprise Freedom Action Committee
The Enterprise Freedom Action Committee is a political action committee. The group spent $315,000 on a campaign against Donald Trump during the 2016 Republican primaries.

Criticism

Berman has appeared on 60 Minutes, The Colbert Report, and CNN in support of his organizations. 60 Minutes has called him "the booze and food industries' weapon of mass destruction," labor union activist Richard Bensinger gave him the nickname "Dr. Evil," and Michael Kranish of the Boston Globe dubbed him a "pioneer" in the "realm of opinion molding." In September 2013, The Huffington Post included Berman on its list of "America's Ruling Class Hall of Shame", described as a "sleazy corporate front man."

The Humane Society of the United States (HSUS) and the Restaurant Opportunities Center have criticized Berman. HSUS has carried out its own investigations of CCF and Berman, and filed complaints about CCF with the IRS. CCF has responded by filing its own complaint with the IRS against HSUS.

Labor groups pushing to increase the minimum wage are also taking a tough line against Berman and his clients. The Restaurant Opportunities Center has taken an aggressive approach in its campaigns against Berman's base of support within the National Restaurant Association and related enterprises.

In a January 4, 2015 article, Salon criticized Berman as a propagandist, "a gifted translator of biz-think into the common sense of the millions".

Berman has responded to such criticism by stating that his groups have acted as "watchdogs who question the motivation, tactics and fundraising efforts of these powerful groups" and that targets "throw mud" instead of "debating the actual issues".

Berman was featured in a 2019 episode of John Oliver’s ‘Last Week Tonight’ on “Astroturfing”.

References

1942 births
Living people
American nonprofit chief executives
Critics of animal rights
American lobbyists
Transylvania University alumni
William & Mary Law School alumni
Berman family
Bethlehem Steel people